The Orontes himri (Carasobarbus chantrei) is a ray-finned fish species in the family Cyprinidae.

It is found in Syria and Turkey. Its natural habitats are rivers and freshwater lakes. It is threatened by habitat loss.

Endangerment
According to the IUCN Red List endangered species the population is declining as a result of habitat degradation in the Orontes River basin in Turkey, and in Syria.

References

Carasobarbus
Fish described in 1882
Taxonomy articles created by Polbot